Paula Thompson (17 November 1984) is a Jamaican netball player who currently plays for Jamaica internationally. She was one of the members of the Jamaican netball team which secured bronze medals at the 2010 World Netball Series, 2013 Fast5 Netball World Series, 2014 Commonwealth Games, and in the 2018 Commonwealth Games.

Thompson was one of the key members who were part of the Jamaican squad which stunned defending Commonwealth Games champion and world champion, New Zealand in the bronze medal match as a part of the 2018 Commonwealth Games.

References 

1984 births
Jamaican netball players
Commonwealth Games bronze medallists for Jamaica
Commonwealth Games medallists in netball
Netball players at the 2014 Commonwealth Games
Netball players at the 2018 Commonwealth Games
Living people
2007 World Netball Championships players
2011 World Netball Championships players
Medallists at the 2014 Commonwealth Games
Medallists at the 2018 Commonwealth Games